Gigasaran is a village (now called Gigasan) and former petty princely state in Gujarat, western India. 

It lies in Sorath prant, on Saurashtra peninsula.

History 
Gigasaran was a petty princely state in Western Kathiawar, comprising solely the village, ruled by Kathi Chieftains.

It had a population of 582 in 1901, yielding a state revenue of 6,600 Rupees (1903-4, nearly all from land) and a paying no tribute.

External links and Sources 
History
 Imperial Gazetteer, on dsal.uchicago.edu - Kathiawar

Princely states of Gujarat
Kathi princely states